EBU R 128 is a recommendation for loudness normalisation and maximum level of audio signals. It is primarily followed during audio mixing of television and radio programmes and adopted by broadcasters to measure and control programme loudness. It was first issued by the European Broadcasting Union in August 2010 and most recently revised in August 2020.

 employs an international standard for measuring audio loudness, stated in the ITU-R BS.1770 recommendation and using the loudness measures LU (loudness units) and LUFS (loudness units referenced to full scale), specifically created with this purpose. The EBU Tech 3341 document further clarified loudness metering implementation and practices in 2016.

Premise 
The same peak level does not necessarily produce the same loudness, because the use of dynamic range compression and limiting can increase the average level of the programme without increasing its peak level. Starting from the early 1990s through the early 2010s, both the music and the advertising industries urged the continuation of this practice to ensure that music and advertising spots became louder without exceeding the maximum permitted peak level. This phenomenon is known as the loudness war.

The resulting inconsistencies and changes in loudness, especially between programmes and commercials, became a frequent cause of complaints from viewers and listeners. To help address these problems, the International Telecommunication Union (ITU) developed new algorithms to measure audio programme loudness in a manner similar to how the human ear perceives sounds and studied new methods to measure loudness over a long-term timeframe. This would allow normalising the loudness of different programs and programme contents appropriately.

Development 
To find practical solutions for the switch from peak normalisation to loudness normalisation, the EBU Production Management Committee formed an international working group comprising sound engineers from various radio stations and broadcasting institutes. Its name, PLoud, derived from a combination of the words production and loudness.

The group first developed evaluation and measurement methods to guide the development of appropriate measurement instruments in the industry. It drafted a technical document to enable broadcasters and programme producers to change their sound processing to the new recommendation, while another technical document dealt with the procedures to follow in the signal distribution.

Specification

Definitions 
To characterise the level and the dynamic range of an audio signal,  introduced new units of measurement:

Normalisation 
This measurement is the integrated loudness calculated over the whole duration of the programme and in the entirety of its contents (i.e. without emphasising specific foreground elements, such as voice).

To ensure loudness meters developed by different manufacturers provide the same reading, EBU Tech 3341 defines EBU Mode which describes how to perform the measurement using the ITU-R BS.1770 recommendation.

Metering 
EBU Mode specifies three distinct methods which analyse loudness over three different timeframes:
 Short-term (S), using a sliding time window of 3 seconds, describes a more averaged, less event-dependant loudness of the past three seconds;
 Integrated (I), averaging the programme from start to finish, describes the loudness of the whole programme.

Real-time meters must provide an update rate of at least  for short-term meters and of at least  for integrated loudness meters.

To prevent silent passages of a programme from misrepresenting the overall loudness measurement, integrated loudness is measured through two gating functions: absolute and relative. Measurement is not gated in momentary and short-term loudness metering.

Implementation 

EBU  and EBU Mode have been implemented by several software developers, audio technology companies and content distributors, including Adobe, Apple, Dolby, iZotope, Magix, PreSonus, Sony, Steinberg, TC Electronic, Toyo and Waves.

Real-time metering plug-ins aid engineers in their mixing decisions and in delivering -compliant programmes, while broadcasters and content distributors can check and normalise whole programmes by performing a faster-than-real-time analysis; programmes produced before the recommendation are likely to be lowered in volume to match the target level.

Ebumeter is software for Linux that provides level metering according to EBU R 128.

Adoption and aftermath 
The recommendation encourages the use of a wider dynamic range in production but does not restrict the use of dynamic range compression. In essence, it ties the use of compression to artistic and aesthetic decisions, rather than the necessity of obtaining a louder mix. With the adoption of normalisation by broadcasters since the introduction of EBU , reducing dynamic range in production does not render the program louder in broadcast. Widespread adoption of ITU-R BS.1770 and EBU , combined with the prevailing of streaming over physical media distribution in the 2010s, arguably put an end to the loudness war.

Starting in 2012, European countries integrated EBU  to their audiovisual legislation and television stations in Europe adopted it on all distribution channels. Sky UK adopted  in 2013.

 is applicable also to radio programmes and is gradually being introduced in European radio broadcasts: for example, German public broadcaster BR changed its radio programmes at the end of 2015.

Since  implementation is not binding, some television stations have imposed additional conditions on programme production.

Through the 2010s, Internet streaming services have implemented loudness-based normalisation, even though each platform uses different methods and target levels: for example, YouTube and Tidal use downward normalisation only (turn down louder content to match the target level, but do not turn up quieter content). Apple Music activates loudness normalisation when the iTunes Sound Check option is enabled.

References

External links
 ffmpeg-normalize – Open-source utility to normalise audio files in batch processing using Python and the FFmpeg framework
 EBU R 128 Normalizer – Component for the freeware player foobar2000 to analyse and normalise audio files during playback

European Broadcasting Union
Sound technology